Paul Ogden (born 18 December 1946) is an English football coach and former player who is currently chief scout at Barrow.

He played for Port Vale and Altrincham. He was manager of Leek Town in six separate spells, spanning nearly forty years, and also coached Northwich Victoria, Kidsgrove Athletic, and Witton Albion. He later worked as a scout at Mansfield Town and Barrow.

Playing career
Ogden played for Leek Castle as a left-winger before he was spotted by Port Vale, joining them as an amateur in November 1965. He made two Football League appearances in 1965–66. Released in the spring of 1966, he moved into non-league football.

Management career
Ogden first took over at Leek Town in 1969, leaving the position six years later. After a spell as manager of Northwich Victoria, he returned to Leek in 1977, only to depart the following year.

In 2002, he was made caretaker-manager of Leek Town for a third time, 33 years after he was first appointed there. After John Ramshaw left the post, Ogden was re-appointed as permanent manager in 2003 for what was to be a two-year spell. He then became manager of Kidsgrove Athletic. Leek had gone through three managers between 2005 and 2007 and Ogden was made manager yet again in June 2007. His final spell seemingly came to an end when he was forced to retire due to ill health six games into the 2007–08 season, however just one month later he returned to take charge for one last game prior to a permanent successor being announced. He returned to the club yet again in January 2008, to assist new player-manager Wayne Johnson. After two years out of the game, he was appointed manager of Witton Albion in May 2010, after the resignation of Gary Finley. Six years previously, he had turned down the management job at Witton, a decision which he described as 'a mistake'.

In June 2011, he was named as Mansfield Town's new head scout by manager Paul Cox, who had played for Leek Town nine years earlier. During his time at Field Mill Mansfield won promotion to the English Football League. He left the club in August 2014. Cox again employed Ogden as his chief scout in December 2015, shortly after Cox was appointed manager of Barrow. Ogden was promoted to Head of Football Operations at Barrow in August 2017, meaning he would take over responsibilities for squad planning, player acquisition and development from Cox. He resigned two months later, citing personal reasons. He returned as chief scout in May 2018.

Career statistics
Source:

References

1946 births
Living people
Sportspeople from Leek, Staffordshire
English footballers
Association football midfielders
Port Vale F.C. players
Altrincham F.C. players
English football managers
Leek Town F.C. managers
Northwich Victoria F.C. managers
Stafford Rangers F.C. managers
Kidsgrove Athletic F.C. managers
Witton Albion F.C. managers
Northern Premier League managers
Association football coaches
Association football scouts
Mansfield Town F.C. non-playing staff
Barrow A.F.C. non-playing staff